Muhammad ibn Shu'ayb al-Zarkun al-Balluti, known as Zerkounes in the Byzantine sources, was the fourth Emir of Crete.

The surviving records on the internal history and rulers of the Emirate of Crete are very fragmentary. He is tentatively identified as a son of the second emir, Shu'ayb, and the grandson of the conqueror of Crete and founder of the emirate, Abu Hafs Umar.

References

Sources
 
 
 

9th-century Arabs
10th-century Arabs
9th-century rulers in Europe
10th-century rulers in Europe
Emirs of Crete
People from Crete